European Opportunities Trust, formerly Jupiter European Opportunities, is a large British investment trust dedicated to investments in European companies. Established in 2000, the company is a constituent of the FTSE 250 Index and it has been managed since launch by Alexander Darwall. The chairman is Andrew Sutch. The company changed its name from Jupiter European Opportunities Trust to European Opportunities Trust in November 2019.

References

External links
 Official site

Financial services companies established in 2000
Investment trusts of the United Kingdom